Kishore Singh Rathore (born 27 April 1969) is a Nepali politician and Deputy general secretary of Neapli Congress. Rathore is also a member of the House of Representatives elected under the proportional representation system from Nepali Congress filling the reserved seat for Khas-Arya group. He is also a member of the House Finance Committee. In the shadow cabinet of Nepali Congress, he was the coordinator of the Ministry of Sports and Youth Affairs.

Political career
He joined politics as a student in 1984, from Nepal Student Union, the student wing of Nepali Congress. He became the Free Student Union secretary and then Chairman while he was in Trichandra College. He went on to become secretary of Nepal Student Union, and then chairman for six years. He was also the founding chair of FSU Forum. Later, he went on to become central member of Nepali Congress.

He was a candidate from Bardiya-4 for Nepali Congress, in the Second constituent assembly election of 2013.

Personal life
He was born on 27 April 1969 to Mahendra Bahadur Singh and Indira Singh in Wadagaun, Salyan. His family later moved to the Terai and currently lives in Rajapur, Bardiya. He has a son and a daughter.

References

Living people
Nepali Congress politicians from Lumbini Province
1969 births
Nepal MPs 2017–2022
Tri-Chandra College alumni
Nepal MPs 2022–present